Faryab-e Isin (also Romanized as Fāryāb-e Īsīn; also known as Farīāb, Fāryāb, and Parīāb) is a village located in Isin Rural District, in the Central District of Bandar Abbas County, Hormozgan Province, Iran. At the 2006 census, its population was 1,155, in 268 families.

References 

Populated places in Bandar Abbas County